Sindhi Language Bill, 1972 was introduced by the Chief Minister Mumtaz Bhutto on July 3, 1972, in the Sindh Assembly, Pakistan.  The 1972 Language violence in Sindh occurred starting on July 7, 1972, when the Sindh Assembly passed the Sind Teaching, Promotion and Use of Sindhi Language Bill, 1972 which established Sindhi language as the sole official language of the province resulting in language violence in Sindh. Due to the clashes, Prime Minister Zulfikar Ali Bhutto explained that this bill is not against Urdu language. Later an ordinance was also promulgated to clarify it. The original bill as passed by the Sindh Assembly on 7 July 1972 is still in place.

Clauses
It provided inter alia that:

Clause 4
 (1) Sindhi and Urdu shall be compulsory subjects for study in classes IV to XII in all institutions in which such classes are held.
 (2) The introduction of Sindhi as a compulsory subject shall commence at the lowest level namely class IV and by stages to be prescribed, be introduced in higher classes up to class XII.

Clause 6
Subject to the provisions of the Constitution, Government may make
arrangements for progressive use of Sindhi language in offices and
departments of Government including Courts and Assembly.

See also
 1972 Language violence in Sindh
 Sindhi language
 Sindhudesh
 Muhajir people

External links
 Laws for language: If the British used Sindhi, why shouldn’t we, experts urge minister

References

Government of Sindh
Language conflict in Pakistan
Politics of Karachi
Politics of Sindh
Sindhi language